Hashmatullah Barakzai (born August 26, 1987) is an Afghan football player who plays for Shaheen Asmayee F.C. in the Afghan Premier League.

International goals

Achievements
Top Scorer of Kabul Premier League: 2007, 2008.

Top scorer of Afghan Premier League with 7 Goals in 6 caps for Shaheen Asmayee F.C. and best player of the tournament in 2013/14 season.

Honours

Afghanistan
SAFF Championship: 2013

External links

Afghan men's footballers
Living people
Pashtun people
Footballers from Kabul
Shaheen Asmayee F.C. players
Kabul Bank FC players
1987 births
Association football forwards
I-League players
Expatriate footballers in India
Afghanistan international footballers